Ezomo of Benin is a title held by the supreme war chief in the ancient Benin Kingdom. The chief with the Ezomo title is the 3rd highest ranking chief in the Benin Kingdom. The Ezomo of Benin title was initially awarded to any notable warrior in the Kingdom by the Oba of Benin. However, during the reign of Ezomo Ehenua, the Oba of Benin Kingdom, Oba Akenzua I, made the title hereditary to the Ehenua family. The Ezomo is known to live in Uzebu in a semi-independent state.

Ezomos of Benin Kingdom 

 Ezomo Ehenua
 Ezomo Odia
 Ezomo Ekeneza
 Ezomo Erebo
 Ezomo Osifo
 Ezomo Uzama
 Ezomo Osarogiagbon
 Ezomo Omoruyi
 Ezomo Asemota
 Ezomo Aiweragbon
 Ezomo Okponmwense

See also 
List of the Ogiso

Kingdom of Benin

Oba of Benin

References